David Wrench (born  in Keighley, West Yorkshire, England) is an English former rugby league footballer who played for Leeds Wakefield and Halifax. Wrench started his career with Leeds and was a part of the infamous 1998 academy championship side.He then made his first senior appearance for Leeds in 1998 but it was not until 2001 where he broke through and made 21 appearances that season. Following this, Wrench signed For Wakefield and played 96 games for the club. He signed for Halifax originally in the 2006 season on loan from Wakefield Trinity Wildcats but after a successful loan period his move was made permanent in Autumn 2006.

References
Statistics at rugbyleagueproject.org
Profile at leedsrugby

1978 births
Living people
English rugby league players
Halifax R.L.F.C. players
Leeds Rhinos players
Rugby articles needing expert attention
Rugby league players from Keighley
Rugby league props
Rugby league second-rows
Wakefield Trinity players